The Korean manual alphabet is used by the Deaf in South Korea who speak Korean Sign Language. It is a one-handed alphabet that mimics the shapes of the letters in Hangul, and is used when signing Korean as well as being integrated into KSL.

Consonants
The only letter with motion as a component is ssang siot, which starts as two crossed fingers pointing down and then snaps open.

Vowels

Note that the difference in orientation between eo, yeo and the diphthongs based on them, e, ye is not significant.

See also

Korean language
Korean sign language

Korean language
Manual alphabet